The 1988 Berlin Marathon was the 15th running of the annual marathon race held in Berlin, West Germany, held on 9 October. Tanzania's Suleiman Nyambui won the men's race in 2:11:45 hours, while the women's race was won by Poland's Renata Kokowska in 2:29:16. West Germany's Markus Pilz (1:52:08) and Switzerland's Gabriele Schild (2:52:29), won the men's and women's wheelchair races. A total of 13,117 runners finished the race, comprising 11,986 men and 1131 women.

Results

Men

Women

References 

 Results. Association of Road Racing Statisticians. Retrieved 2020-05-30.

External links 
 Official website

1988
Berlin Marathon
1980s in West Berlin
Berlin Marathon
Berlin Marathon